Bearblock is a surname. Notable people with the surname include:

John Bearblock, 16th-century English illustrator
Walter Bearblock (1796–1857), English cricketer